For Mónica Naranjo album see Palabra de mujer

Palabra de mujer (English: A Woman's Word) is a Mexican telenovela produced by José Alberto Castro for Televisa in 2007. Is a remake of Mexican telenovelas El amor tiene cara de mujer and Principessa.

On Monday, October 22, 2007, Canal de las Estrellas started broadcasting Palabra de mujer weekdays at 6:00pm, replacing Amor sin maquillaje. The last episode was broadcast on ended on Friday, May 9, 2008 with Querida enemiga replacing it the following day.

Edith González, Yadhira Carrillo, Ludwika Paleta, Lidia Ávila, Juan Soler, Alejandro de la Madrid, Rafael Puente Jr. and Lisardo starred as protagonists, while Cynthia Klitbo, Víctor Noriega and Agustín Arana starred as antagonists.

 Plot Palabra de Mujer follows the interconnected lives of four women from varied social backgrounds in Mexico City: Vanesa, Fernanda, Paulina and Matilde, all of whom work for a production company that is producing a television talk show that shares the same name as the series.

The plot begins as Vanesa approaches a female friend, Delia, to help her establish a production company to produce quality programming for women with Fernanda, Paulina, Matilde and Irmita supporting the business venture. The television program they seek to produce becomes the motivation that Vanesa needs to rebuild her life after Julian, her husband of 22 years, left her for a younger woman. Vanesa lives with her two children, Clara and Emiliano, who are ignorant of the fact that many of the marital woes experienced by their mother and father were because they lost their first son 20 years earlier while vacationing in Spain. Since Neither Vanesa nor Julian have never truly recovered the loss of their first son, their separation has proven even more painful as it has served as a reminder of their past tragedy. Early in the story, Martin, a life long friend of Vanesa's becomes an enduring source of love and support for her, hardening tensions between herself and Clara, who is still lovingly devoted to her father.

Paulina, on the other hand, has had a relatively easy life considering she was raised in a wealthy family. However, she is still troubled at her parents' recent divorce. Though she is single and living with her embittered aunt, her life changes dramatically when she pardons her father and moves to live with he and his new wife, Flora. She is welcomed enthusiastically by her new stepmother, but quickly finds that her stepbrother Adrián is less than enthusiastic about her, which is due primarily to the fact that he has a growing distrust of her father. The two eventually put tensions aside as they find they share more than contempt for one another, and the flames of passion ignite.

Fernanda lives alone with her teenage daughter, Bety, who also serves as her mother's best friend. Fernanda's Husband Emanuel, Bety's father,  left her to marry a wealthier woman. However, Fernanda's luck changes when she meets Hernán, a rugged adventurer with lingering commitment issues. Though he has lived life by his own rules, he strives to make a new life with her.

Matilde is the creative genius who, though she hails from humbler origins (her father is a mechanic and her mother works in the market), balances her new professional life with her recent marriage to Robert, Delia's son.

The series roughly follows the balance between the personal and professional lives of the four main characters. A common plot device in the program is how the women leverage professional success to gain control of personal lives that have spiraled out of control.

 Cast 
Main
 Edith González as Vanesa Noriega Blanco de Medina Yadhira Carrillo as Fernanda Ortiz Barquín de Gil Ludwika Paleta as Paulina Álvarez y Junco Navarro Lidia Ávila as Matilde Solano Mellado de Landeta Cynthia Klitbo as Delia Ibarra Perfecta Vda. de Landeta Juan Soler as Martín Castellanos Víctor Noriega as Emanuel San Román Lisardo as Hernán Gil Rafael Puente Jr. as Roberto "Betito" Landeta Ibarra Alejandro de la Madrid as Adrian Vallejo Navarro Agustín Arana as Julián MedinaSupporting
 Dalilah Polanco as Irma López Otto Sirgo as Mariano Álvarez y Junco Yula Pozo as Doña Rosa de Solano Roberto Ballesteros as Genaro Arreola Julio Bracho as Germán Mondragón Monserrat Oliver as Monserrat Claudia Godinez as Gina San Román Jessica Coch as María Inés Castrejón Margarita Isabel as Consuelo Perfecta Vda. de Ibarra Irma Lozano as Carlota Navarro Vda. Álvarez y Junco Salvador Sánchez as Don Guadalupe "Lupe" Solano Amairani as Sonia de San Román Jacqueline Voltaire as Flora Navarro de Álvarez y Junco Eugenio Cobo as Armando Longoria Dolores Salomon "Bodokito" as Benita Miguel Loyo as Ismael Solano Antonio de la Vega as Saúl Carolina Jaramillo as Tamara Kendra  Santacruz as Clara Medina Noriega Natalia Telléz as Beatriz "Bety" Ortiz Osvaldo de León as Ariel Castellanos Alberich as Emiliano Medina NoriegaAlejandro Nones as Octavio LongoriaÚrsula Montserrat as Silvia LongoriaDaniel Berlanga as Jorge "Danny" Medina NoriegaJéssica Mas as Mireya ArandaRoxana Rojo de la Vega as Erika Valtierra''

Awards

References

External links

 at esmas.com 

2007 telenovelas
Mexican telenovelas
2007 Mexican television series debuts
2008 Mexican television series endings
Spanish-language telenovelas
Television shows set in Mexico City
Televisa telenovelas
Mexican television series based on Argentine television series